Patrick H. "Pete" Johnson Jr. (born May 12, 1948) is an American politician and lawyer who served as State Auditor of Mississippi from 1988 to 1992. Originally a Democrat, he joined the Republican Party in 1989, thus becoming the first Republican to hold statewide office in Mississippi since the Reconstruction era. He mounted an unsuccessful campaign for governor in 1991. He served as Federal Co-Chairman of the Delta Regional Authority from 2002 to 2011.

Early life 
Patrick H. "Pete" Johnson Jr. was born on May 12, 1948 in Alexandria, Louisiana. Both his grandfather, Paul B. Johnson, Sr., and uncle, Paul B. Johnson, Jr., served as Governor of Mississippi. He graduated from Murrah High School in Jackson, Mississippi in 1961. He earned a bachelor's degree in business administration from the University of Mississippi in 1971 and a Juris Doctor degree from Jackson School of Law in 1974. Johnson thereafter joined the Bank of Clarksdale as a senior vice president and also served as President of the Young Bankers Section of the Mississippi Bankers Association. He then formed a financial planning firm. He married Margaret Birdsong and had two daughters with her. While working as an ambulance driver in the 1960s, he contracted Hepatitis C, for which he was formally diagnosed in 1986.

Political career

Early activities and state auditor tenure 
Johnson was initially a member of the Democratic Party. He twice ran to represent Mississippi's 2nd congressional district in the U.S. House of Representatives in 1982 and 1986, in both instances losing in the Democratic primaries to Robert G. Clark, Jr. and Mike Espy, respectively. In 1984, Governor William Allain appointed him Chair of the Mississippi Marketing Council. On May 28, 1987, he declared his candidacy for the office of State Auditor. He secured the Democratic nomination after defeating Al Gary in a primary runoff in late August and defeated Republican city councilman Danny Ware in the November general election. Incumbent auditor Ray Mabus was elected Governor the same election.

Before taking office, Johnson appointed a Committee on Reform of County Government. He assumed the auditor's office on January 7, 1988. Early on in his tenure, he continued the anti-corruption efforts of his predecessor, warning county boards of supervisors about misuse of resources and threatening to claw back misspent funds, though by early May he had announced that he would wait for outstanding legal issues surrounding purchasing standards to be settled before seeking more claw backs. His reform committee compiled a report suggesting structural issues with the beat system of county government and advising counties to transition to a unit form of government. While Mabus pushed for state unit legislation which would mandate that county road construction would be considered in a unified, professional manner, Johnson appealed to the county supervisors to voluntarily commit to centralized management of road construction. The two men entered a dispute when Johnson released a report predicting that switching to unit forms of government would be expensive for counties; Mabus accused him of inflating the projections. A referendum was held in November 1988 which led to several counties voting to switch to unit systems. The auditor's office was tasked with overseeing the transition and Johnson threatened to cut off funds from Tallahatchie County to ensure its supervisors' compliance.

Party switch and gubernatorial campaign 
In early 1989, Johnson announced he was joining the Republican Party, thus making him the first Republican to hold statewide office in Mississippi since the Reconstruction era. He later attributed his decision to switch to the election of moderate Republican George H. W. Bush to the presidency, as well as encouragement from U.S. Senator Thad Cochran. He was invited alongside other party switchers to visit Bush at the White House in May. In 1991 he declared his candidacy for governor and contested for the Republican nomination. As the Republican Party lacked available candidates, no Republican was nominated to contest for the office of auditor in the general election. Johnson was viewed as the early favorite to win the gubernatorial nomination, and thus most of the television ads he aired early in the campaign focused on Mabus instead of his primary opposition. In the Republican primary he faced Kirk Fordice, a conservative contractor who had been active in Republican politics since the 1960s, and Bobby Clanton, a social conservative activist. Fordice characterized Johnson as a "professional politician". Johnson struggled physically throughout the campaign as symptoms from his Hepatitis C affliction—which he kept secret—intensified. The race for the Republican nomination went to a runoff on October 8. Fordice won with 60.6 percent of the vote, while Johnson only earned 39.4 percent. Fordice went on to defeat Mabus in the general election. Johnson later reflected, "It was not meant for me to be governor".

Later life 
After Johnson left office, he began working in the Mississippi office of the Farmers Home Administration and opened a legal practice in Clarksdale. President George H. W. Bush appointed him state director of the Farmers Home Administration in July 1992. He held the office until Bill Clinton became president in January 1993. He purchased a former motel in Flowood and began leasing it to the state's Department of Corrections as a minimum security women's prison in May 1994. He underwent a liver transplant in 1996 to ameliorate his Hepatitis C affliction. In March 2001, President George W. Bush appointed him to become the first Federal Co-Chairman of the Delta Regional Authority. Confirmed by the U.S. Senate in September, he served in the role from 2002 to 2011.

References

Sources
 
 
 
 

1948 births
Living people
American financial businesspeople
Mississippi College School of Law alumni
Mississippi Democrats
Mississippi lawyers
Mississippi Republicans
People from Alexandria, Louisiana
People from Clarksdale, Mississippi
State Auditors of Mississippi
United States Department of Agriculture officials
University of Mississippi alumni